Placanica is a comune (commune or municipality) in the Province of Reggio Calabria in the Italian region Calabria, located about  south of Catanzaro and about  northeast of Reggio Calabria. Placanica borders the following communes: Caulonia, Pazzano, Stignano.

See also

Vallata dello Stilaro Allaro

References

Cities and towns in Calabria
Vallata dello Stilaro